Saurabh Das (born 1 November 1993) is an Indian first-class cricketer who plays for Tripura. He made his List A debut on 27 February 2014, for Tripura in the 2013–14 Vijay Hazare Trophy.

References

External links
 

1993 births
Living people
Indian cricketers
Tripura cricketers
Cricketers from Tripura